Cherry Grove, formerly Cherry Grove Station, is an unincorporated community in Madison Township, Montgomery County, in the U.S. state of Indiana.

History
Cherry Grove was established in 1851 as a railroad switch. The community was likely named after the wild cherry trees in the area.

Geography

References

Unincorporated communities in Montgomery County, Indiana
Unincorporated communities in Indiana